Bruce David Maher (July 25, 1937 – July 6, 2018) was an American football safety in the National Football League for the Detroit Lions and New York Giants. He played college football at the University of Detroit Mercy and was drafted in the 15th round of the 1959 NFL Draft.
Personal life: wife Gerda Furumo
6 children Sheila John Sharon Luke Matthew & Jesalyn

References

1937 births
2018 deaths
Players of American football from Detroit
American football safeties
Detroit Lions players
New York Giants players
Detroit Titans football players
University of Detroit Jesuit High School and Academy alumni